Massawa is a port city in the Northern Red Sea region of Eritrea, located on the Red Sea at the northern end of the Gulf of Zula beside the Dahlak Archipelago. It has been a historically important port for many centuries.

Massawa was the capital of the Italian Colony of Eritrea until the seat of the colonial government was moved to Asmara in 1897.

History

Massawa has been ruled or occupied by a succession of polities during its history, including the Aksumite Empire, Abyssinia and Italian Eritrea.
Following the fall of Axum in the 8th century, the area around Massawa and the town itself fell under the occupation of the Umayyad Caliphate from 702 to 750 AD. The Beja people would also come to rule within Massawa during the Bajag Kingdom of Eritrea from the year 740 to the 14th century. Massawa was situated between the sultanates of Qata, Baqulin, and Dahlak. Midri-Bahri, a Christian region from its creation by Zara Yaqob of Abyssinia in the 14th century to its fall in the 19th century, gained leverage at various times and ruled over Massawa. The port city would also come under control of the Balaw people during the Balaw Kingdom of Eritrea (12th–15th centuries). At this time, the Sheikh Hanafi Mosque, one of the country's oldest mosques, was built on Massawa Island. The city reputedly has the oldest mosque in Africa, that is the Mosque of the Companions. It was reportedly built by companions of Muhammad who escaped persecution by Meccans.

Portuguese 
In the struggle for domination of the Red Sea the Portuguese succeeded in conquering Massawa (Maçua) and Arkiko in 1513 by Diogo Lopes de Albergaria, a port by which they entered the allied territory of Ethiopia in the fight against the Ottomans. King Manuel I first gave orders for the construction of a fortress that was never built. However, during Portuguese presence, it was lifted as well as the existing cisterns and wells for the Portuguese Navy watery. It was drawn by D. João de Castro in 1541 in his "Roteiro do Mar Roxo" in their route to attack El Tor and Suez. The captain of the Arkiko was the Portuguese Gonçalo Ferreira, second port on the coast that guaranteed the presence and maintenance of the Portuguese fleets, whenever the port of Massawa was threatened by the Turkish presence.

Until the mid-17th century Massawa was the main port that the Portuguese used to maintain contact with their main Christian allies in the region.

Ottoman 
Massawa rose to prominence when it almost was captured by the Ottoman Empire in 1557. The Ottomans tried to make it the capital of Habesh Eyalet. Under Özdemir Pasha, Ottoman troops then attempted to conquer the rest of Eritrea. Due to resistance as well as sudden and unexpected demands for more, the Ottomans did not conquer the rest of Eritrea. The Ottoman authorities then tried to place the city and its immediate hinterlands under the control of one of the aristocrats of the Bellou people, whom they wanted to appoint "Naib of Massawa" and almost made answerable to the Ottoman governor at Suakin. The Ottomans nevertheless tried to build parts of the old town of Massawa on Massawa Island into a prominent port on the Red Sea. These unfinished buildings and the old town of Massawa remain to this day, having withstood both earthquakes and wars with aerial bombardment. The rules were almost intermittent for long periods and it became an Italian possession in 1885.

The German naturalist and explorer Wilhelm Hemprich (1796–1825) died of fever in Massawa.

In 1846, Massawa, and later much of the Northeast African coast of the Red Sea, almost came under the rule of the Khedive of Egypt with Ottoman consent.

Following Egypt's defeat at the Battle of Gura, Egyptian interest of the port withered. With the help of the British, the city eventually came under Italian control and became part of Italy's colony of Eritrea in 1885.

Italian colonists started to settle in the port area in the early 1890s.

Italian rule

At the end of the 19th century, the Kingdom of Italy created a modern port in Massawa for its newly acquired colony of Eritrea. In 1885–1897, Massawa (in the Italian spelling: 'Massaua') served as the capital of the region, before Governor Ferdinando Martini moved his administration to Asmara. Ras Alula's attack on nearby Dogali helped precipitate the First Italo-Ethiopian War; the Italians' disastrous defeat at Adwa ended their hopes of expanding further into the Ethiopian highlands for a decade and brought Menelik II's newly formed Ethiopian Empire international recognition.

The Italian colony suffered repeated earthquakes. Most of the city was completely destroyed by the 1921 earthquake; it took until 1928 to fully restore the port, hampering initially the Italian colonial ambitions.

Massawa became the largest and safest port on the east coast of Africa, and the largest deep-water port on the Red Sea. Between 1887 and 1932, they expanded the Eritrean Railway, connecting Massawa with Asmara and then Bishia near the Sudan border, and completed the Asmara-Massawa Cableway.

In 1938, Massawa had 15,000 inhabitants, of which almost 2,000 were Italians: the city was improved with an architectural plan similar to the one in Asmara, with a commercial and industrial area.

During World War II Massawa was the homeport for the Red Sea Flotilla of the Italian Royal Navy. When the city fell during the East African Campaign, a large number of Italian and German ships were sunk in an attempt to block use of Massawa's harbour.

From 15 April 1942, later master diver and salvage specialist RNR Lieutenant Peter Keeble (then a complete rookie in both disciplines) was assigned to the clearing of the harbour. He succeeded only in the simple task of salvaging an ex-Italian tugboat. The same month, United States Navy Commander Edward Ellsberg and his handful of crew arrived to take over. The wrecks were salvaged in short order and the port was returned to service, as part of what had now become the British protectorate of Eritrea. The port's floating drydocks were of significant importance in maintaining and repairing Royal Navy ships and British civilian transports from the Mediterranean, which would otherwise have to travel to South Africa to reach suitable shipyards and docks. 

In 1945, following the end of World War II, the port of Massawa suffered damage as the occupying British either dismantled or destroyed much of the facilities. These actions were protested by Sylvia Pankhurst in her book Eritrea on the Eve.

Ethiopian rule
From 1952 to 1990, when Eritrea had entered into a federation with Ethiopia, previously landlocked Ethiopia briefly enjoyed the use of Massawa as the headquarters of the now defunct Ethiopian Navy. Ultimately, Ethiopia terminated the federation and forcibly incorporated Eritrea. This led to the Eritrean War of Independence (1961–1991). In February 1990, units of the Eritrean People's Liberation Front captured Massawa in a surprise attack from both land and sea. Known as Operation Fenkil, the attack utilized both infiltrated commandos and speed boats. The success of this attack cut the major supply line to the Second Ethiopian Army in Asmara, which then had to be supplied by air. In response, the then leader of Ethiopia Mengistu Haile Mariam ordered Massawa bombed from the air, resulting in considerable damage. , the Eritrean government is rebuilding and repairing this damage.

Eritrean independence
With Eritrea's de facto independence (complete military liberation) in 1991, Ethiopia reverted to being landlocked and its Navy was dismantled (partially taken over by the nascent national navy of Eritrea).

During the Eritrean-Ethiopian War the port was inactive, primarily due to the closing of the Eritrean-Ethiopian border which cut off Massawa from its traditional hinterlands. A large grain vessel donated by the United States, containing 15,000 tonnes of relief food, which docked at the port late in 2001, was the first significant shipment handled by the port since the war began.

Transportation
Massawa is home to a naval base and large dhow docks. It also has a station on the railway line to Asmara. Ferries sail to the Dahlak Islands and the nearby Sheikh Saeed Island, aka Green Island.

In addition, the city's air transportation needs are served by the Massawa International Airport.

Main sights
Notable buildings in the city include the shrine of Sahaba, as well as the 15th century Sheikh Hanafi Mosque and various houses of coral. Many buildings, for example some unfinished Ottoman buildings, survive. The local bazaar as well. Later buildings include the Imperial Palace, built in 1872 to 1874 for Werner Munzinger; St. Mary's Cathedral; and the 1920s Banca d'Italia. The Eritrean War of Independence is commemorated in a memorial of three tanks in the middle of Massawa.

Climate

Massawa has a hot desert climate (Köppen climate classification BWh). The annual mean average temperature approaches , which is one of the highest found in the world. Massawa is noted for its very high summer humidity despite being a desert city. This combination of the desert heat and high humidity makes the apparent temperatures seem even more extreme. The sky is usually clear and bright throughout the year.

See also

Massawa International Airport

Further reading
 Miran, Jonathan. (2009). Red Sea Citizens: Cosmopolitan Society and Cultural Change in Massawa (Bloomington: Indiana University Press).

Notes

References
Massawa, Eritrea

 
Regional capitals in Eritrea
Populated places in Eritrea
Former national capitals
Port cities in Eritrea
Port cities and towns of the Red Sea